Rapides Lumber Company Sawmill Manager's House is located in Woodworth, Louisiana.  It was added to the National Register of Historic Places on November 26, 1990.  It was delisted in 2015.

References

Houses on the National Register of Historic Places in Louisiana
Houses in Rapides Parish, Louisiana
Former National Register of Historic Places in Louisiana
National Register of Historic Places in Rapides Parish, Louisiana